Texas in July is the third studio album from Texas in July.  The album was produced by Will Putney, recorded at Machine Shop Studios in Belleville, New Jersey, and released on October 9, 2012, with "Bed of Nails", the first single from the album, released on September 11, 2012.  The entire album was streamed online one week prior to its release.

The album features percussion from Matt Greiner of August Burns Red, vocals from David Stephens of We Came as Romans and Chadwick Johnson of Hundredth.

The album peaked at No. 4 in the Billboard Top Heatseekers chart.

Track listing 
 "Initiate" – 0:56
 "Cry Wolf" – 3:19  
 "Shallow Point" – 2:38  
 "Without a Head" (featuring Chadwick Johnson of Hundredth) – 3:54  
 "Bed of Nails" – 2:59  
 "Repressed Memories" – 3:37  
 "C4" (featuring David Stephens of We Came As Romans) – 3:43  
 "Crux Lust" – 3:24  
 "Paranoia" – 3:05  
 "Black Magic" – 2:58  
 "Cloudy Minds" (featuring Matt Greiner of August Burns Red) – 3:10
 "Time-Lapse" - 3:28 (Deluxe Edition Bonus)
 "03 Deville" - 4:20 (Deluxe Edition Bonus)
 "Forbidden Fruit" - 4:20 (Deluxe Edition Bonus)

References

External links
 http://www.cduniverse.com/productinfo.asp?pid=8821876&style=music

2012 albums
Texas in July albums
Equal Vision Records albums
Albums produced by Will Putney